Sandyford is a stop on the Luas light rail tram system in Dún Laoghaire–Rathdown, south of Dublin, Ireland which serves the nearby suburb of Sandyford. It opened in 2004 as the southern terminus of the Green Line, which re-uses the alignment of the Harcourt Street railway line which closed in 1958. Sandyford Luas stop is located on the same site as a station on the old line called Stillorgan.

History

Railway station (1854–1958)
The Harcourt Street railway line was and opened by the Dublin and Wicklow Railway in 1854, running from a temporary terminus at Harcourt Road near the city centre to Bray with Stillorgan was originally one of four intermediate stops on the line.  The station was located on Brewery road, which the line crossed on a bridge.  There was a station building on the down platform (for trains towards Bray), and a small waiting room on the up platform.  Passenger access between the platforms was via an iron footbridge.  There was also a signal box a short distance up the line.

Closure (1959-2004)

The Harcourt Street line had declined in use throughout the early 20th century and was closed by CIÉ at the end of 1958.  The tracks were lifted soon after and all stations on the route were auctioned off.  Stillorgan station building became a private residence.  The platforms and bridges were later demolished and the signal box fell into disuse.

Luas (2004-present)
Construction of the first phase of the Luas system commenced in 2001 and concluded in 2004.  The route chosen for the Green Line re-used the old Harcourt Street alignment between Charlemont and Stillorgan.  The terminus stop which was built on the site of the old Stillorgan is called Sandyford (a separate stop called Stillorgan was built around 500m up the line).  The stop was built with two side platforms and a crossover to allow trams to turn back.  The depot for the Green Line was built immediately beyond the stop.

In 2010, the Green Line was extended south to Brides Glen.  After Sandyford, the line diverges from the old Harcourt Street route in order to serve some more populous areas on the Ballyogan Road, and re-joins it just before Carrickmines.  A third platform was built at Sandyford.

In 2018, the platforms were lengthened from 45 to 55 metres, and the depot was significantly upgraded.  This was to accommodate the new longer trams introduced to boost capacity.

The stop today
Sandyford stop has ticket machines, shelters, displays, and signage of the same design as other Luas stops.  One platform is bound by a steel railing, the other by a sandstone wall.  The old signal box can still be seen just to the north of the stop.

Sandyford is one of very few Luas stops with three platforms.  On the side adjacent to Stillorgan reservoir, there is an edge platform used for trams coming from the north and continuing to Brides Glen.  There is an island platform for trams travelling northwards.  The track nearest to the road is for trams which have come from Brides Glen, and the middle track is for terminating trams.  The main entrance is a series of steps and ramps which lead from a plaza at the side of the adjacent Blackthorn Avenue to passenger crossings across the tracks.  In addition, a pathway leads from the side platform, past the depot, to Brewery Road, adjacent to the old station building, which remains a private residence.

The stop has a Park and Ride facility with 47 spaces, of which 4 are for disabled badge holders and 2 allow for the charging of electric vehicles.  In addition, the car park at Stillorgan stop has 341 spaces, some of which are physically closer to the platforms at Sandyford.  The car park has entrances to both stops.

Service
Northbound trams run every 5–10 minutes and either terminate at Parnell or continue to Broombridge.  Of the southbound trams which arrive at Sandyford, around half terminate there, with the rest continuing south to Brides Glen.  The stop is also served by Dublin Bus routes 11, 47, 114, 116, and an independent bus operator called Finnegan Coaches.

Gallery

References

Luas Green Line stops in Dún Laoghaire–Rathdown
Disused railway stations in County Dublin
Railway stations opened in 1854
Railway stations closed in 1958
Sandyford
1854 establishments in Ireland
Railway stations in the Republic of Ireland opened in the 19th century